Derks is a surname. Notable people with the surname include:

Frans Derks (1930–2020), Dutch football referee and sports executive
Mike Derks (born 1962), Canadian football player

See also
 Derk (given name)
 DIRKS
 Perks (surname)